Stockham can refer to:

People
 Alice Bunker Stockham (1833-1912), fifth woman doctor in the United States 
 Bob Stockham (born 1970), American football player
 Fred W. Stockham (1881-1918), United States Marine, posthumous recipient of the Medal of Honor
 John Stockham (1765-1814), British naval officer
 Thomas Stockham (1933-2004), American scientist

Places
 Stockham, Nebraska, a village in Hamilton County, Nebraska, in the United States

Ships
, a British frigate in service in the Royal Navy from 1943 to 1946
, more than one United States Navy ship